Just Because I'm a Woman may refer to:

 Just Because I'm a Woman (1968 album), by Dolly Parton
 Just Because I'm a Woman, a 1976 compilation album, see Dolly Parton compilation albums discography
 Just Because I'm a Woman: Songs of Dolly Parton, a 2003 Dolly Parton tribute album